Chryseobacterium glaciei  is a Gram-negative, aerobic and non-spore-forming bacteria from the genus of Chryseobacterium which has been isolated from the surface of a glacier near the Kunzum Pass in India.

References 

glaciei
Bacteria described in 2018